Evel Knievel Factor is the second studio-album by the Finnish rock group Private Line. It was released in Finland on 1 November 2006. Two singles have been released from the album: "Broken Promised Land" on 31 May 2005, and "Sound Advice" on 28 January 2007. The b-side on the "Broken Promised Land" single is the album track "Uniform", while as b-sides to "Sound Advice" are two previously unreleased songs, "Tokyo" and "Criminal". The title is a reference to legendary American motorcycle daredevil Evel Knievel.

Track listing

 "(Prelude) For The Daredevils" (1:08)
 "Evel Knievel Factor" (3:34)
 "Broken Promised Land" (4:02)
 "Alive" (3:50)
 "Sound Advice" (3:42)
 "The SINdicate" (3:46)
 "Prozac Nation" (2:58)
 "Uniform" (3:37)
 "Gods Of Rewind" (4:08)
 "Anyway" (4:18)
 "Billion Star Hotel" (5:05)
 "Tokyo" (3:53) (* bonus track for the Japan release)
 "He's A Whore" (Rick Nielsen) (* bonus track for the Japan release. Originally recorded by Cheap Trick).

Singles

Singles released from the Evel Knievel Factor album as follows:

Broken Promised Land (31 May 2006)
 "Broken Promised Land" (4:02)
 "Uniform" (3:37)

 Sound Advice (31 January 2007) 
 "Sound Advice" (3:42)
 "Tokyo" (*previously unreleased)
 "Criminal (Manchuria, Claude)" (*previously unreleased. Originally recorded by Smack)

2006 albums
Private Line albums